Sergei Anatolyevich Shmonin (24 November 1968 – 23 November 2020) was a Russian football player.

External links
 

1968 births
2020 deaths
Russian footballers
PFC Krylia Sovetov Samara players
Russian Premier League players
Association football midfielders